The Seven Dwarfs are a group of seven fictional  dwarfs that appear in the 1812 fairy tale Snow White and other renditions and adaptations.

History
The Seven little people are a group of seven dwarfs that live in a tiny cottage and work in the nearby mines, Snow White stumbles upon their house after being told by the Huntsman to flee from the Queen's kingdom.

The Seven little people return home and immediately notice someone has snuck in, because the house has been cleaned. During their loud discussion, they discover the sleeping Snow White. She wakes up and explains to them what happened. The Dwarfs take pity on her, saying: "If you will keep house for us, and cook, make the beds, wash, sew, and knit, and keep everything clean and orderly, then you can stay with us, and you shall have everything that you want." They warn her to be careful when alone at home, and to not let anyone in while they are delving in the mountains.

When the Queen, disguised as an old peddler, ties a colorful, silk bodice onto Snow White, it causes her to faint. The Seven Dwarfs return just in time and Snow White is saved when the Dwarfs cut the lace. The Queen comes once again, this time dressed as a comb seller. She gives Snow White a poisoned comb, but the Seven Dwarfs save her again. The Queen then appears disguised as a farmer's wife and gives Snow White a poisoned apple. Snow White bites into it and falls to the ground, apparently dead. This time, the Seven Dwarfs are unable to revive the girl, because they can't find the source of Snow White's physical state and, assuming that she is dead, they place her in a glass coffin. After some time has passed, a Prince traveling through the land sees Snow White. He walks up her coffin and instantly falls in love with her, enchanted by her beauty. As the Prince transports her body back to his castle, her coffin is hit hard and a large piece of apple in her throat is released and thus revives her. The prince then marries Snow White and "they lived happily ever after".

Response from people with dwarfism
As a prominent cultural portrayal, the Seven Dwarfs have been recently controversial among people with dwarfism. One critical scholar has said it "followed the conventions of the freak show and perpetuated contemporary prejudices in their constructions of people with dwarfism," portraying them as "incapable, humorous, weird, childlike," and "overly naïve, perhaps even dim-witted." In 2022, the actor Peter Dinklage criticized Disney's planned live-action remake of Snow White and the Seven Dwarfs as being responsible for "renewing damaging stereotypes", saying "You’re progressive in one way but you’re still making that fucking backward story of seven dwarves living in the cave. What the fuck are you doing, man?"

Others in the dwarfism community expressed different opinions. Professional wrestler Dylan Postl, better known by his ring persona Hornswoggle, voiced his disagreement with Dinklage in an interview where he, along with other dwarf actors, accused Dinklage of just virtue signalling and opined that Dinklage's condemnation of the Seven Dwarfs' portrayal, and Disney's replacement of them with anonymous "magical creatures" and portrayed by voice actors, would have deprived dwarf actors of a possible starring role in a film based on an established property, denouncing Dinklage as "hypocritical" and "selfish...trying to take roles away". Comedian Brad Williams also expressed a similar sentiment, in that while he seemed to partly agree with Dinklage by calling the portrayal "mildly offensive" (likely with irony), he stated that there are ways to work around the issue by depicting the Dwarfs as a potential love interest for Snow White and de-emphasizing the prince's role in the story, also complimenting the positive aspects of the characters: "I mean, they have jobs, you know? They got good friends. They got a house. They like to protect her [Snow White]. They're diamond miners, so they're rich. They're self-made, wealthy."

Appearances in modern media

Disney Dwarfs

A Disney version of the Seven Dwarfs, also called Disney Dwarfs as a potential Disney Consumer Products/DisneyToon Studios franchise, appeared in Snow White and the Seven Dwarfs, the Seven Dwarfs in this are:
 Doc (voiced by Roy Atwell in the film, Jim Cummings and André Sogliuzzo in later projects, Bill Farmer in The 7D) – The leader of the seven dwarfs, Doc wears glasses and often mixes up his words.
 Grumpy (voiced by Pinto Colvig in the film, Corey Burton in later projects, Maurice LaMarche in The 7D) – Grumpy initially opposes Snow White's presence in the dwarfs' home, but later warns her of the threat posed by the Queen and eagerly rushes to her aid upon realizing that she is in danger, leading the charge himself. He has the biggest nose of the dwarfs and is the slimmest of the seven, and is frequently seen with one eye shut or with a frown.
 Happy (voiced by Otis Harlan in the film, Kevin Schon and Stephen Stanton in later projects, Kevin Michael Richardson in The 7D) – Happy is the jovial dwarf and is usually portrayed laughing. While the other dwarfs have thin black eyebrows inspired by Walt Disney's eyebrows, his eyebrows are white and thicker.
 Sleepy (voiced by Pinto Colvig in the film, Bill Farmer in later projects, Stephen Stanton in The 7D) – Sleepy is always tired and appears lethargic in most situations.
 Bashful (voiced by Scotty Mattraw in the film, Jeff Bennett in later projects, Billy West in The 7D) – Bashful is very shy and kind-hearted. He is also described as cute and romantic, with a crush on Snow White. He often blushes when is embarassed or at the center of the attention.
 Sneezy (voiced by Billy Gilbert in the film, Bob Joles in later projects, Scott Menville in The 7D) – Sneezy's name is earned by his extraordinarily powerful sneezes (caused by hay fever), which are seen blowing even the heaviest of objects across a room.
 Dopey (vocal effects provided by Eddie Collins in the film, Dee Bradley Baker in The 7D) – Dopey is the youngest dwarf, being the only one who does not have a beard and is bald, with the largest ears of the dwarfs. He is accident-prone and mute, with Happy explaining that he has simply "never tried" to speak. He is unvoiced like Gideon the Cat in Pinocchio, the title character as the circus elephant Dumbo, and Tootles in Peter Pan. Furthermore, he shares his name with another Disney character, one of the Dumbo crow characters, "Dopey", also known as "Straw Hat".

The Seven Dwarfs also appeared in Seven Wise Dwarfs, All Together, The Winged Scourge, and House of Mouse.

In the early 2000s, DisneyToon Studios (DTS) joined Disney Consumer Products (DCP) as their internal Disney conglomerate video partner in developing the new Disney franchises. While DCP eyed other potential franchises, DisneyToon looked to the Seven Dwarfs for a male-centric franchise to counterbalance the female-centric Disney Fairies. By 2005, The Seven Dwarfs computer-animated sequel to Snow White was officially underway. Paul and Gaëtan Brizzi was one team that was given an attempt at a movie pitch, which was to follow the Dwarfs in which they trap the villain in the magic mirror and setting it up for Snow White movie. Given the possible demand, Buena Vista Games brought in Obsidian Entertainment, a game developer, who pitched a video game focusing on the Dwarfs' similar ancestors. DTS executives were not feeling that the two franchise launching projects were coming together well enough that they turned to Mike Disa, who worked on the Tinker Bell story. Disa and Evan Spiliotopoulos pitched a The Lord of the Rings-style epic for the dwarfs while "connecting seamlessly" with the original film, which was given permission to move forward. With interfering managers wanting a tragic back story for Dopey, Disa decided that he could not go forward. Walt Disney Animation Studios chief creative officer John Lasseter about two month later ended production on the film.

The 7D is an American animated television series produced by Disney Television Animation based on Snow White and the Seven Dwarfs. It is a re-imagining of the title characters from the 1937 film and their adventures prior to the introduction of Snow White. The TV series details the 7D working for Queen Delightful where they protect Jollywood from the Glooms and other threats.

The Seven Dwarfs were given a new theme park attraction called the Seven Dwarfs Mine Train coaster.

In Descendants, Descendants 2 and Descendants 3, Dopey is shown to have a son named Doug (portrayed by Zachary Gibson) who can talk and becomes smitten by Evil Queen's daughter Evie. In the Descendants novel The Isle of the Lost, Doc is shown to be sympathetic towards the Goblins that operate on the Isle of the Lost's Goblin Wharf where they want amnesty for their involvement with Maleficent.

Sneezy is among the bootlegged toons in the 2022 live-action film adaptation of Chip 'n Dale: Rescue Rangers.

Sesame Street
In Sesame Street, there were different versions of the Seven Dwarfs where each of them was made from Anything Muppets.

 The Six Dwarfs seen in Episode 279 consisted of Sparky (performed by Jerry Nelson), Snooky (performed by Jerry Nelson), Pokey (performed by Jim Henson), Flakey (performed by Jim Henson), Drippy (performed by Jerry Nelson), and Sneaky (performed by Jim Henson). Snow White visited their house instead of the Seven Dwarf by mistake and was able to see the difference.
 In a Sesame Street News Flash that was seen in Episode 2787, the Seven Emotional Dwarfs appear where they were interviewed by Kermit the Frog. Their names are Cheerful (performed by Richard Hunt), Sad (performed by Kevin Clash), Angry (performed by Jerry Nelson), Proud (performed by Martin P. Robinson), Fearful (performed by David Rudman), Lovey (performed by James Kroupa), and Surprised (performed by Jim Martin).
 In Episode 4114, the Seven Dwarfs appear opposite Snow White (portrayed by Amy Sedaris). The Seven Dwarfs consist of Clumsy (performed by Joey Mazzarino), Vertigo (performed by Fran Brill), Gassy (performed by Matt Vogel), Itchy (performed by Carmen Osbahr), Smelly (performed by Martin P. Robinson), Sensitive-Nose (performed by Ryan Dillon), and Hammy (performed by Eric Jacobson).

Grimm's Fairy Tale Classics
In the "Snow White" episode of Grimm's Fairy Tale Classics, the Seven Dwarfs are named Sunday (voiced by Clifton Wells in the English dub), Monday (voiced by Kerrigan Mahan in the English dub), Tuesday, Wednesday (voiced by Tom Wyner in the English dub), Thursday, Friday (voiced by Michael Sorich in the English dub), and Saturday (voiced by Edward Mannix in the English dub) and are shown to be allied with a pack of wolves.

Happily Ever After
In Happily Ever After, it was mentioned that the Seven Dwarfs have opened up a mine in the next kingdom. In their place is the Seven Dwarfelles (their female cousins) who have received a power based on nature to help out their boss Mother Nature.

The Dwarfelles consisted of:

 Muddy (voiced by Carol Channing) – A Dwarfelle who has power over the earth, and as such performs such tricks as causing minor tremors and such. She feels most comfortable playing in the mud.
 Sunburn (voiced by Sally Kellerman) – A Dwarfelle who has power over sunlight, and is able to focus sun rays in any area and to whatever extremity she so wishes. She uses her power in the film to clear away clouds and summon down a beam of light to illuminate a dark cave. She has a New Yorker accent and attitude and her catchphrase is "This really BURNS me up!".
 Blossom (voiced by Zsa Zsa Gabor) – A Dwarfelle who has power over plants and flowers, and is seen throughout the animation zapping the ground and having flowers spring up. It becomes apparent that her flora powers are less effective if the area is less natural or adaptable, as in the Realm of Doom. Blossom is very reminiscent of her voice actress with Gabor's mannerisms, penchant for the beautiful and fashionable, and even her signature accent.
 Marina (voiced by Linda Gary) – A Dwarfelle who has power over all lakes and rivers, but the only example of her powers in the film is being able to breathe underwater. Marina carries herself as a gentlewoman and has a British accent.
 Critterina (voiced by Linda Gary) – A Dwarfelle who has power of all animals who are created by Mother Nature. She is able to communicate with all animals, regardless of their creators, but does not have control over animals who are not Mother Nature's work like Lord Maliss' one-horned wolves. Although the other Dwarfelles are human in appearance, Critterina looks anthropomorphic. She aptly has a cowgirl mentality and a Texan accent.
 Moonbeam (voiced by Tracey Ullman) – A Dwarfelle is never seen using her powers, but has the distinct characteristic of being in a deep slumber and sleepwalking in the day, and only awaking at night.
 Thunderella (voiced by Tracey Ullman) – The seventh and youngest Dwarfelle, and is considered the 'black sheep' of the seven because of her inability to control her powers. She has power over weather, and always seems to mess her attempts at creating storms. She ends up saving the day by hitting Lord Maliss with a bolt of lightning she creates from her fingertip.

The Dwarfelles helped Snow White on her quest to rescue the Prince from the Queen's sorcerer brother Lord Maliss.

Snow White (1990)
The Seven Dwarves appear in the 1990 Snow White film voiced by Jim Cummings and Rob Paulsen.

Happily Ever After: Fairy Tales for Every Child
In Happily Ever After: Fairy Tales for Every Child, the show's adaptation of "Snow White" that takes place in the American southwest depicts the Seven Dwarves as seven mystical little men who came from the north to mine turquoise. They consist of:

 Bright Silver (voiced by Pato Hoffmann) – The leader of the seven little men.
 Fool's Gold (voiced by Burr DeBenning) – The clumsiest little man.
 Smelly Sulfur (voiced by Burr DeBenning) – The smelliest little man.
 Hard Jade (voiced by Tim Sampson) – The strongest little man.
 Rough Copper (voiced by Jim Great Elk Waters) – Named for his temper, but is also quick-witted.
 Sharp Flint (voiced by Michael Horse) – Named for his sharp tongue. 
 Heavy Metal (voiced by Sonny Skyhawk/Sonny Roubideaux) – The hungriest little man.

Shrek
The Seven Dwarfs appear in the Shrek series.

In Shrek, the Seven Dwarfs appear in the first film carrying Snow White's coffin. When they place the coffin on the table, Shrek says "Oh no no no no! Dead broad off the table!" One of the Dwarfs says "Where else are we supposed to put it? The bed's already been taken." Shrek promptly finds the Big Bad Wolf in his bed.

They are seen again at the start of Shrek 2, giving Shrek a ring engraved with "I love you" in flaming letters for Fiona (in an allusion to the One Ring from The Lord of the Rings).

In Shrek the Third, one of them is given to Fiona as a wedding present (as a babysitter) from Snow White who says she has six more at home.

The Seven Dwarfs are seen at the end of Scared Shrekless when Shrek and Fiona celebrate by egging them.
 
In Shrek The Musical, one of the dwarfs Grumpy knew that he abandoned his son Farquaad in the woods as a child after his wife The Princess and the Pea falls out of 25 mattresses. However, when the fairytale characters brought Grumpy to Farquaad's wedding, he reveals that he kicked Farquaad out because he was twenty-eight years old and living in his basement.

Mirror Mirror
In Mirror Mirror, the Seven Dwarfs work as Highwaymen and rob from anyone that comes down their way by wearing boots with retractable stilts that make them look taller. The Seven Dwarfs consist of:

 Will Grimm (portrayed by Danny Woodburn) – The leader of the Seven Dwarfs. He is named after the Brothers Grimm.
 Butcher (portrayed by Martin Klebba) – A Dwarf that used to work as a butcher.
 Wolf (portrayed by Sebastian Saraceno) – A Dwarf in a wolf cape who can also howl.
 Napoleon (portrayed by Jordan Prentice) – A Dwarf that wears a hat similar to Napoleon Bonaparte.
 Half Pint (portrayed by Mark Povinelli) – A Dwarf who has a crush on Snow White.
 Grub (portrayed by Joe Gnoffo) – A Dwarf who is always eating.
 Chuck (portrayed by Ronald Lee Clark) – A Dwarf who chuckles a lot.

The Seven Dwarfs help Snow White to form a resistance against Queen Clementianna.

Princesses
In the Princesses series by Jim C. Hines, the dwarfs are actually anthropomorphic elemental personifications, summoned by Snow to aid her based on a spell from one of her mother's books. The seven dwarfs represent Earth, Air, Fire, Water, Light, Shadow, and Magic, although the 'Magic' dwarf is essentially a spirit that just inhabits Snow and enhances her power rather than appearing on its own, with the others appearing in some form to represent their element. Although powerful fighters that will serve Snow loyally, the consequences of summoning them is that Snow must 'pay' the spirits with seven years of her life, with the result that she appears to be in her mid-thirties when she is really only in her early twenties. As a result, she has only summoned the dwarves twice, initially calling on their aid to help her defeat her mother before the series began, and summoning them again to help her and her allies defeat her mother's spirit in the first book in the series (she contemplated summoning them against to deal with the ruthless Wild Hunt in Red Riding's Revenge, but was advised against it as the spiritual nature of the hunt meant that nobody could be sure if the dwarves could do anything against them).

Snow White and the Huntsman
In Snow White and the Huntsman, the Seven Dwarfs started out as eight dwarfs when they are encountered by Snow White and Eric the Huntsman while fleeing Queen Ravenna. The Seven Dwarfs are:

 Beith (portrayed by Ian McShane) – The leader of the Seven Dwarfs. His name is the name of the first letter ("B") in the Ogham alphabet.
 Muir (portrayed by Bob Hoskins) – The blind elder dwarf who possesses the powers of premonition and is the father of Quert. His name echoes muin, the name of "M" in the Ogham alphabet.
 Quert (portrayed by Johnny Harris) – The son of Muir. His name echoes ceirt, the name of "Q" in the Ogham alphabet.
 Coll (portrayed by Toby Jones) – The brother of Duir. His name is the name of "C" in the Ogham alphabet.
 Duir (portrayed by Eddie Marsan) – The brother of Coll. His name is the name of "D" in the Ogham alphabet.
 Gort (portrayed by Ray Winstone) – An ill-tempered dwarf. His name is the name of "G" in the Ogham alphabet.
 Nion (portrayed by Nick Frost) – Beith's right-hand dwarf. His name is the name of "N" in the Ogham alphabet (sometimes given as nuin).
 Gus (portrayed by Brian Gleeson) – A dwarf who develops a bond with Snow White. He is killed during an attack by Queen Ravenna's men where he sacrifices his life to protect Snow White. His name does not correspond to an Ogham letter.

The Dwarfs were played by actors without dwarfism who had their faces digitally transmuted onto small bodies, prompting a protest from the Little People of America.

In The Huntsman: Winter's War, Nion returns where he aids Eric the Huntsman in retrieving the Magic Mirror which was stolen before it can be sealed away. They are aided by Nion's half-brother Gryff (portrayed by Rob Brydon) who is a debt collector.

Once Upon a Time
In Once Upon a Time, the Seven Dwarfs (who started out as eight) are on the side of Snow White and go by their Disney names.

 Grumpy (played by Lee Arenberg) is one of eight Dwarf brothers who hatched from their eggs at the same time. Like all dwarfs, he is immediately sent to work in the mines and is given a pickax, which names him Dreamy. Because his egg was accidentally sprinkled with fairy dust by the fairy Nova, he dreams about her and falls in love with her. Later, he meets her and the pair make plans to buy a boat and see the world. However, the Blue Fairy tells him that if he and Nova run away together, she will lose her wings and she will never be truly happy. To prevent this, Dreamy ends their relationship and breaks her heart. He returns to the mines the next day and breaks his pickax mining; when he is given another, it renames him Grumpy. He is later caught possessing a stolen diamond, which he did not know was stolen, and is seen in King George's dungeon in a cell next to Snow White's. He is freed by Stealthy, one of his brothers, and he in turn frees Snow. As he and Stealthy escape, they are discovered by George and his guards and Stealthy is killed. Before the guards can kill Grumpy, Snow goes with George in exchange for Grumpy's life. Grumpy and the remaining six dwarfs run into Snow outside the castle. Grumpy tells her that she must live with the pain of a lost love to grow as a person and does not allow her to drink a potion that makes her forget about her love for Prince James. The seven dwarfs then allow her to live with them. Later, Grumpy goes to tell her that James called off his wedding, but he discovers that she drank the potion. He and his brothers try to confront Snow about her new, mean-spirited behavior, but they drive her to try and kill the Evil Queen instead. He takes her to see Rumplestiltskin, who gave her the potion, but he advises her on the best way to kill the Queen instead. Eventually, Snow regains her memory and apologizes to the dwarfs for her behavior. She decides to rescue James, who was captured by George, and Grumpy and his brothers go with her. Grumpy is later seen discussing the best course of action against the Evil Queen and her curse, calling for war. He is also seen as a guard looking out for the curse in a watchtower of Snow's and James's castle. In Storybrooke, he is Leroy, a janitor at the hospital and the "town drunk." He, like the rest of Storybrooke, is hostile toward Mary Margaret, who is Snow White, after learning about her affair with David Nolan, who is Prince James. He meets Sister Astrid, who is Nova, and decides to help Mary Margaret sell candles for the nunnery and raise money for the nunnery's rent so that he can be near Astrid. When he and Mary Margaret fail to sell enough candles, he lies about the number they sold because he is unable to disappoint Astrid. He tries to sell his boat to Mr. Gold in the hopes that he will forgive the rent. Mr. Gold refuses. Astrid later learns about the candles and is upset that he lied. That night, Leroy causes a blackout, forcing the residents to buy candles. The candles sell out and the nunnery is able to pay its rent. Leroy then offers the grateful Astrid the opportunity to be the first passenger on his boat. Leroy's memories as Grumpy are restored when the curse is broken, and he hugs Snow when he next sees her. He wishes for Regina to be killed by the mob led by Dr. Whale, though he decides against it at Snow's insistence. He unites the Dwarfs together and they begin to mine for fairy dust again.
 Sleepy (played by Faustino Di Bauda) – Sleepy is a sleepy dwarf who is one of the Seven Dwarfs. In Storybrooke, he is Walter, a security guard that works at Storybrooke Hospital who occasionally dozes off on the job.
 Sneezy (played by Gabe Khouth) – Sneezy is a dwarf who often sneezes and is one of the Seven Dwarfs. In Storybrooke, he is Tom Clark, the owner of the Dark Star pharmacy where several characters are seen purchasing different products throughout the show. In Season 2, Sneezy joined the other dwarfs in an experiment that involved why the fairy tale characters can't leave Storybrooke. Upon drawing the shortest straw, Sneezy crossed the border out of Storybrooke and lost his memories of his past life in Fairy Tale Land once again.
 Doc (played by David Paul Grove) – Doc is a dwarf who is one of the Seven Dwarfs. In Storybrooke, he still has his name but his occupation is unknown.
 Bashful (played by Mig Micario) – Bashful is a dwarf who is one of the Seven Dwarfs. In Storybrooke, his human form is not named.
 Dopey (played by Jeffrey Kaiser) – Dopey is a dwarf who is one of the Seven Dwarfs and has never spoken. In Storybrooke, his human form is not named.
 Happy (played by Michael Coleman) – Happy is a dwarf who is one of the Seven Dwarfs. In Storybrooke, his human form is not named.

There were some other dwarfs that were associated with the Seven Dwarfs:

 Stealthy (played by Geoff Gustafson) was a dwarf who used to be part of the Seven Dwarfs' group. He received his name from his pickaxe like the other dwarfs because of his skillful infiltration abilities. He once tried to break Grumpy and Snow White out of his prison cell in King George's castle, but was killed during their escape. Grumpy would later comment, "I miss Stealthy", when trying to sneak into an enemy lair. He later ended up in the Underworld and after Henry gives him his unfinished business being his resentment towards Bashful he is able to move and ask Henry to tell his brother he misses them. In the Wish Realm, Stealthy is seen to be alive after Queen Snow and King David defeated the Evil Queen.
 Bossy (played by Ken Kramer) is a dwarf who is also the leader of the other dwarfs.
 Watchy (played by Richard Ian Cox) is a dwarf who watches over the dwarf eggs until they hatch.

The Goodies
In the first episode of the final series of The Goodies (which was filmed at ITV), The Goodies did a story set in a fairy tale world where they replaced three of the seven dwarfs (two of them died of exposure and another one was eaten by a gold fish). But they are later found out because of their height. The dwarfs take their names from the Disney film (Sleepy, Happy, and Grumpy) while Graeme and Bill renamed themselves to fit in (Soppy and Gwotty). Only Tim kept his name.

Additional appearances
The following is a list of names of the Seven Dwarfs from various adaptations of the Snow White story. Some adaptations do not name the dwarfs, have seven non-dwarfs (such as the seven Leafe Knights in the anime Prétear - The New Legend of Snow White) or omit them altogether (as in the 1998 opera Schneewittchen).

Additional mentions 
Taylor Swift mentions the seven dwarves in her song "The Best Day", a track about her childhood.

The guns of the British battleship HMS Nelson, officially known as "Right, Centre or Left" gun in "A", "B" or "X" turret, were unofficially named by the crew, "Mickey", "Minnie", "Grumpy", "Sneezy", "Dopey", "Bashful", "Happy", "Sleepy" and "Doc".

References

Literary characters introduced in 1812
Fictional dwarves
Fictional mining engineers
Male characters in fairy tales
Snow White characters
Fictional septets